Brunswick was launched at Hull and initially was a Greenland whaler. Her owner withdrew her from the northern whale fishery in 1836 and then deployed her sailing to New York and Sierra Leone. She was apparently on a voyage to India when she was wrecked on 7 April 1842.

Career
Brunswick first appeared in Lloyd's Register in 1814 with W. Blythe (or Blyth), master, Wright & Co., owner, and trade Hull–Davis Strait. Blythe would be her master from 1814–1816, and again from 1818–1814, when she left whaling. The whaling data below is primarily from Coltish, augmented with data from Lubbock.

In 1823, at the end on May, a strike by a whale fluke killed one seaman and injured three others.

Brunswick left the ice at the whale fishing grounds on 16 August 1822. She arrived at Hull on 18 September with 50 tons of oil. She reported that conditions on the fishing grounds were very bad. Seven ships had been sunk, several had been beset by ice, and the rest had not killed more than an average of four fish each. Laetitia, Clark, master, arrived at Aberdeen and reported a more complete accounting of how many whales each vessel had taken, and which were beset by ice.
 
A fuller account of Brunswicks survival exists. By this account, also, she left for England on 27 August and arrived in the Humber on 10 September. The 13 days transit from Davis Straits was a record.

On 22 May 1825, Brunswick was close to Estridge, of Dundee, when she sank. Brunswick took on board seven of Estridges crew. In 1825, Brunswick was the best fished ship of the Davis Strait fleet.

On 7 June 1827, a harpooned whale struck one of Brunswicks boats, overturning it. Two men drowned. An hour later, another of her boats killed a whale, which turned out to be the whale that had overturned the first boat. On 16 June Brunswick and Zephyr came across the wreck of Mercury. Brunswick was able to salve 34 butts of blubber.

Eighteen-thirty was the most disastrous year in the history of British northern whaling. Brunswick was among the vessels most seriously damaged, though she was not lost.

In 1834 Wright & Co. withdrew Brunswick from whaling and put her into general trade.

Fate
Brunswick, Porter, master, was wrecked on 7 April 1842 on the Sunk Sand, in the North Sea off the coast of Suffolk. The smack Good Agreement, Brown, master, rescued the crew and brought them into Wivenhoe. Brunswick was on a voyage from Hull to London.

The entry for Brunswick in Lloyd's Register for 1841 bears the annotation "Wrecked".

Citations

References
 
 
 
 

1814 ships
Age of Sail merchant ships of England
Whaling ships
Maritime incidents in 1841